José-Antonio Chalbaud (born 2 July 1931) is a Venezuelan former sports shooter. He competed in the 25 metre pistol event at the 1964 Summer Olympics.

References

1931 births
Living people
Venezuelan male sport shooters
Olympic shooters of Venezuela
Shooters at the 1964 Summer Olympics
Place of birth missing (living people)
Pan American Games medalists in shooting
Pan American Games bronze medalists for Venezuela
Shooters at the 1967 Pan American Games
20th-century Venezuelan people
21st-century Venezuelan people